Sri Lanka National Deaf Cricket Team represents Sri Lanka in international deaf cricket arena. The team consists of players who are having hearing problems (deaf). The team also participated in the 3rd edition of the 2017 Deaf Cricket Asia Cup tournament in India. The team ended up as runners-up to India in the finals, lost the match by a big margin of 156 runs.

In November 2017, the national deaf cricket team played their first ever leather ball ODIs and T20Is against Pakistan, a team which is considered as the most consistent team in deaf cricket history.

On 30 November 2018, Sri Lanka created history after winning the 2018 Deaf T20 World Cup which was also the first ever instance where Sri Lanka managed to win a Deaf T20 World Cup defeating India by 36 runs.

Current squad
 Tharaka Sampath Jayasinghe (Captain)
 Lakshan Fernando (VC)
 Sumudu Lanka
 Tharinda Deepika Wimalasena
 Goyum Shanaka Walgama
 Nalin Sameera
 Asanka Manjula 
 Udaya Lakmal
 Priyankara Madushanka
 Kumarasamy Thirukumaran
 Alenross Kalep
 N.P.G.Ushan Lakshitha
 G.A. Nuwan Hasaranga
 A.P. Dinuka Sachin
 Anton Jayasegaram 
 Antony Norman

See also 
 Sri Lanka national blind cricket team

References 

National sports teams of Sri Lanka
Sri Lanka in international cricket
Deaf cricket teams
Deaf culture in Sri Lanka